Taylor Township is the name of some places in the U.S. state of Pennsylvania:

 Taylor Township, Blair County, Pennsylvania
 Taylor Township, Centre County, Pennsylvania
 Taylor Township, Fulton County, Pennsylvania
 Taylor Township, Lawrence County, Pennsylvania

See also 
 East Taylor Township, Cambria County, Pennsylvania
 Middle Taylor Township, Cambria County, Pennsylvania
 West Taylor Township, Cambria County, Pennsylvania
 Taylor, Pennsylvania, a borough in Lackawanna County
 Taylor Township (disambiguation)

Pennsylvania township disambiguation pages